The Singapore Police Service Good Service Medal may be awarded to an eligible person from the Singapore Police Force, Singapore Prisons Service and Central Narcotics Bureau in recognition of his good, efficient and faithful service. Eligible person should have rendered regular or voluntary service on a part-time basis or a combination of both for a continuous period of at least 5 years. 2 years of police national service and 3 years of reserve service could be counted towards the minimum requirement for a PNSMen.

Description
The obverse side of the Medal bear the Singapore Coat-of-Arms encircled by the inscription “POLIS REPABLIK SINGAPURA”.
Prior to 2004, the obverse side of the Medal neared the Singapore Coat-of-Arms encircled by the inscription “ SINGAPORE POLICE SERVICE”.
The reverse side of the Medal bear the inscription “FOR GOOD SERVICE” encircled by a laurel wreath.
 The ribbon has golden yellow stripe in the centre, flanked on each side by vertical blue stripes.

References

Civil awards and decorations of Singapore
Singapore Police Force
Law enforcement awards and honors